Joaquín Hernández Hernández (born 14 April 1964 in Castelldefels) is a Spanish former cyclist, who was professional from 1987 to 1991. He is best known for winning the second stage of the 1989 Vuelta a España.

Major results
1983
 1st Stage 3b Cinturón a Mallorca
1989
 1st Stage 2 Vuelta a España
 1st Stage 6 Volta ao Alentejo
1990
 6th Overall Vuelta a la Comunidad Valenciana
 7th Trofeo Masferrer
1991
 6th GP Industria & Artigianato

Grand Tour general classification results timeline

References

External links
 

1964 births
Living people
Spanish male cyclists
Spanish Vuelta a España stage winners
People from Castelldefels
Sportspeople from the Province of Barcelona
Cyclists from Catalonia
20th-century Spanish people
21st-century Spanish people